William Crossley may refer to:
 Sir William Crossley, 1st Baronet, British engineer and politician
 William Crossley, 3rd Baron Somerleyton, British courtier